Parastathes basalis is a species of beetle in the family Cerambycidae. It was described by Gahan in 1907.

References

Astathini
Beetles described in 1907